Kilsyth was an electoral district of the Legislative Assembly in the Australian state of Victoria. It was a 41 km² electorate located in the outer eastern suburbs of Melbourne, encompassing the suburbs of Bayswater North and Croydon South and parts of the suburbs of Kilsyth, Lilydale and Montrose. The electorate had a population of 52,701 at the 2001 census.

Kilsyth was created as a nominally Liberal seat at the 2002 election. It was contested at that election by Liberal MP Lorraine Elliott, whose nearby electorate of Mooroolbark had been abolished in the redistribution. Elliott was not expected to face a serious challenge at the election, but amidst a statewide Labor landslide, was defeated in a major upset by Labor candidate Dympna Beard. Beard's narrow victory left Kilsyth as one of the most marginal seats in the state, and she faced an extremely close race at the 2006 election. The final result was not known for several days, with Liberal candidate David Hodgett eventually being declared the victor by 185 votes. In 2010, Hodgett was returned with a significantly increased margin and over 60% of the 2PP vote.

Members for Kilsyth

Election results

See also
 Parliaments of the Australian states and territories
 List of members of the Victorian Legislative Assembly

References

External links
 Electorate profile: Kilsyth District, Victorian Electoral Commission

2002 establishments in Australia
2014 disestablishments in Australia
Former electoral districts of Victoria (Australia)